Janine is a given name and may refer to:

People
 Janine Balding (1967–1988), Australian murder victim
 Janine Bazin (1923–2003), French film and television producer
 Janine Beermann (born 1983), German field hockey player
 Janine Berdin (born 2002), Filipina singer
 Janine Charrat (1924–2017), French dancer and choreographer
 Janine Duvitski (born 1952), English actress
 Janine Flock (born 1989), Austrian skeleton racer
 Janine P. Geske (born 1949), American jurist and law professor
 Janine Greiner (born 1981), Swiss curler
 Janine Gutierrez (born 1989), Filipina actress and television host
 Janine Haines (1945–2004), Australian politician
 Janine Irons, British music educator, artist manager and producer
 Janine Kohlmann (born 1990), German modern pentathlete
 Janine Leal (born 1976), Venezuelan television presenter and model.
 Janine Lindemulder (born 1968), American exotic dancer and adult film actress
 Janine Pommy Vega (1942–2010), American poet
 Janine Rozier (born 1938), French senator
 Janine Thompson (born 1967), Australian tennis player
 Janine Tugonon (born 1989), Filipino model, TV presenter and beauty pageant titleholder
 Janine Turner (born 1962), American actress
 Janine van Wyk (born 1987), South African women's footballer
 Janine Zacharia, American journalist

Fictional characters
 Janine Butcher, in EastEnders
 Janine Nebeski,  in Bad Girls
 Janine (Pokémon), in the Pokémon universe
 Janine Melnitz, in the Ghostbusters films
 Janine Stifler, aka Stifler's Mom, in the American Pie film series
 Janine, a recurring [[Characters of Friends|character in sitcom Friends]] played by Elle Macpherson
 Janine, a fictional character from Witch and Wizard, a novel by James Patterson
 Janine, the previous name of Ofwarren, a fictional character from The Handmaid's Tale, a novel by Margaret Atwood

See also
Janeen
 Janie
 Jeanine
 Jeannine